A guild hosting or clan hosting service is a specialized type of web hosting service designed to support online gaming communities, generally referred to as guilds or clans.  They vary from game server hosting in that the focus of such companies is to provide applications and communication tools outside the gaming environments themselves.

Guild hosting services address a guild's basic need to have an online presence and allow guild members to communicate with each other outside of the game.  While it is possible for any guild to do this on their own, setting up and maintaining a site requires constant maintenance, upgrades and integration of new software. One of the key reasons for the popularity of guild hosting services is their focus on relieving the guild from this overhead and freeing them up to spend more time playing the game.

Typical Features 

The services typically offered by such a service include:

 Public and/or private forums for members to communicate between themselves, or other tools for communications such as instant messaging or chat servers.
 Tools for tracking the roster of characters that a player might have in an MMORPG.
 An application for scheduling and organizing raids, tournaments and other gaming events.
 Applications for tracking treasure, items, or points accrued toward redeeming treasure (often referred to as a DKP system).

History 

Originally, most people who decided to create a website for their guild used bulletin board software such as vBulletin and phpBB on traditional web hosting services.  However, as the complexity of online games increased, many guilds sought after more advanced management features and turned to specialized services to accommodate their needs.  However, there is still a considerable base of users who still employ the older method as it can be cheaper and allows them the flexibility to be creative in their efforts and in some cases be able to transfer their guild sites between hosting services.  Many of the services listed below can be accomplished using a cheap hosting account and several open source scripts and a little bit of time.

One of the earliest such companies was GuildPortal, formed in 2001. In 2006, competition increased with the launch of 3 new services: GuildCafe (now GamerDNA), GuildLaunch (now Gamer Launch) and MMO Guildsites (now Shivtr).  In 2007, Guildomatic launched as the first game-specific guild host, paving the way for even more specialized services tailored to individual games. In 2008, two new providers joined the guild hosting scene, iClan Websites  and Ejeet Networks. Ejeet Networks took a massive amount of stakes directly to the guild hosting world and made a press release to Tech2 Gaming  which was then published in the Mumbai Times and placed in a top social media spotlight to this day they offer to the minute technology for guilds.  With guilds increasingly playing more than one game, Enjin launched a new CMS in 2009 with the ability of creating multiple gaming divisions on one website.  The number of guild hosting services continues to grow with the rising popularity of Massively Multiplayer Online Roleplaying Games.

References 

Video game culture
Online games
Web hosting